The 1987 Cameron Aggies football team was an American football team that represented Cameron University and won the national championship during the 1987 NAIA Division I football season. In their fourth season under head coach Brian Naber, the Aggies compiled an 11–2 record.

The team's statistical leaders included tailback Robert Whitman, quarterback Levon Davis, wide receiver Ronald Walters, and Chuck Smith.

Schedule

References

Cameron Aggies
Cameron Aggies football seasons
NAIA Football National Champions
Cameron Aggies football